Thomas Wood FRS (25 September 1708 – 25 June 1799), was a British politician who briefly sat in the House of Commons from 1779 to 1780.

Early life
Wood was born on 25 September 1708. The seventh son of Edward Wood and Elizabeth ( Bridger) Wood (daughter and heiress of Henry Bridger of Bramley, Surrey), he was from Littleton (then in Middlesex, now Surrey).

He was educated at Eton College from 1718 to 1725 before matriculating at Christ Church, Oxford in 1725 and All Souls College, Oxford in 1732.

Career
A barrister, he was called in 1735, made a bencher in 1766, and later served as Treasurer of the Inner Temple where he had been admitted in 1729. In 1748, he succeeded to his brothers estates. A member of the Whig party, he was Member of Parliament for Middlesex from 1779 to 1780. 

He was elected a Fellow of the Royal Society in February 1761.

Personal life
On 2 October 1743 Wood was married to Anne Jones, daughter of Richard Jones. Together, they were the parents of two sons and three daughters, including:

 Thomas Wood, who married Mary Williams (1752–1820), daughter and heiress of Sir Edward Williams, 5th Baronet, of Gwernyfed.

Wood died on 25 June 1799.

Descendants
Through his son Thomas, he was a grandfather of Thomas Wood (1777–1860), MP for Breconshire from 1806 to 1847; he married Lady Caroline Stewart, daughter of Robert Stewart, 1st Marquess of Londonderry and Frances Stewart, Marchioness of Londonderry (daughter of the Whig politician Charles Pratt, 1st Earl Camden).

References

People from the Borough of Spelthorne
1708 births
1799 deaths
Members of the Parliament of Great Britain for English constituencies
British MPs 1774–1780
Fellows of the Royal Society
Lawyers from London